Sinyatkino is a rural locality (a village) in Posyolok Nikologory, Vyaznikovsky District, Vladimir Oblast, Russia. The population was 51 as of 2010. There is 1 street.

Geography 
Sinyatkino is located 19 km southwest of Vyazniki (the district's administrative centre) by road. Nikologory is the nearest rural locality.

References 

Rural localities in Vyaznikovsky District